The 2015 Wigan Metropolitan Borough Council election took place on 7 May 2015 to elect members of Wigan Metropolitan Borough Council in England. This was on the same day as other local elections and the general election.

Overview
Prior to the election, the composition of the council was:

Labour Party: 63
Conservative Party: 2
Independent: 10

After the election, the composition of the council was:
Labour Party: 64
Conservative Party: 3
Independent: 8

Results Summary

Results

Bolton West constituency

Atherton ward

Leigh constituency

Astley Mosley Common ward

Atherleigh ward

Golborne and Lowton West ward

Leigh East ward

Leigh South ward

Leigh West ward

Lowton East ward

Tyldesley ward

Makerfield constituency

Abram ward

Ashton ward

Bryn ward

Hindley ward

Hindley Green ward

Orrell ward

Winstanley ward

Worsley Mesnes ward

Wigan constituency

Aspull, New Springs and Whelley ward

Douglas ward

Ince ward

Pemberton ward

Shevington with Lower Ground ward

Standish with Langtree ward

Wigan Central ward

Wigan West ward

References

2015 English local elections
May 2015 events in the United Kingdom
2015
2010s in Greater Manchester